Ferry Avenue station is a PATCO Speedline station located in Camden and Woodlynne, in Camden County, New Jersey, United States. It is near the busy US Route 130 and situated near the intersection of Camden, Woodlynne and Collingswood.

Station layout 
The fare control is located at street level and the platform is elevated. For most of the platform, there are two tracks, serving the Philadelphia and Lindenwold bound trains.  There is also a third track that starts halfway down the platform. The platform splits and the train can come up into this spot. It was once used by Ferry Avenue Local trains that originated here and went to Philadelphia, but Ferry Avenue Local trains were replaced with Woodcrest Local trains on September 20, 1980. The third track is now used to store a train mid-day.

Crime 
On August 9, 1995, Philadelphia Inquirer truck driver Joseph Sweeney, 49, was fatally beaten during a robbery while delivering newspapers.

On November 12, 2001, Christine Lynn Eberle, 27, a PATCO commuter and resident of Washington Township, Gloucester County, New Jersey was abducted from the station's parking lot and killed. Two men, Ryshaone H. Thomas and Marcus Toliver, were charged with murder, robbery, kidnapping and weapons offenses in connection with the crime. On January 12, 2005, Thomas and Toliver pleaded guilty in New Jersey Superior Court in order to avoid the death penalty.

Notable places nearby 
The station is within walking distance of the following notable places:
 Harleigh Cemetery
 Virtua Our Lady of Lourdes Hospital

References

External links 

Ferry Avenue (PATCO)

PATCO Speedline stations in New Jersey
Transportation in Camden, New Jersey
Woodlynne, New Jersey